Manuel Orantes was the defending champion but lost in the semifinals to Jimmy Connors.
Top-seeded Connors won the championship and $16,000 first-prize money by defeating Björn Borg in the final, in their first match on clay.

Seeds
A champion seed is indicated in bold text while text in italics indicates the round in which that seed was eliminated.

Draw

Finals

Top half

Section 1

Section 2

Bottom half

Section 3

Section 4

References

External links

U.S. Clay Court Championships
1974 U.S. Clay Court Championships